Sima Kotecha (born 14 March 1980, Basingstoke) is a British television and radio journalist working for the BBC in various roles since 2003, including within war zones. Kotecha has served as the UK editor and as occasional presenter of Newsnight.

Early years
Sima Kotecha was born in Basingstoke and attended Richard Aldworth School Her parents are of Indian origin. She went to Surrey University in Guildford and Goldsmiths College, University of London to study for her master's degree in media and communications. Her first job was at BBC Radio Berkshire in 2003 and after that she took up an internship at the BBC's New York bureau. She worked for Talking Movies and BBC Radio 1's Newsbeat as their New York reporter from 2005 to 2010. She later worked for the PM programme on Radio 4 and as a multimedia reporter for the same network's Today programme.

Career
In January 2017, she became the Midlands Correspondent of BBC News appearing regularly on television bulletins. She also presents the BBC One news bulletin at 8pm and has presented Radio 5 Live's Up All Night, 5 Live Breakfast and Drivetime and Newsday on the BBC World Service.

Kotecha has reported from Helmand Province in the conflict in Afghanistan while embedded with US Marines in Garmsiron for two weeks in December 2009. She also covered the 2010 Haiti earthquake and the Syrian refugee crisis. She also covered the 2008 US presidential election, and the Oscars on multiple occasions.

On location with her production team in Leicester in 2020, the crew and Kotecha were harassed while reporting live on the official COVID-19 guidelines. Russell Rawlingson, who suffers from Bipolar Disorder was arrested and charged, he duly attended his sentencing hearing at Leicester Crown Court on 28 May 2021, where he had pleaded guilty to threatening behaviour - he denied any racial element, his plea was accepted by Judge William Harbage QC and the Crown Prosecution Service, prosecutor. Kotecha was reported as saying she did not wish the case to go to trial. Philip Plant from the CPS, consulted with Kotecha prior to the court hearing. On the direction of the sentencing Judge, Rawlingson was detained under S.37 of the Mental Health Act, imposing a "Hospital Order" with the prospect of future release, at his doctors discretion, upon successful completion of his prescribed treatment.

Kotecha regularly reports for BBC Newsnight out on location and occasionally presents the current affairs programme from the studio, if the main regular presenters are unavailable. She was in the Newsnight chair for the first broadcast of 2023, on 4 January.

References

1980 births
Living people
BBC newsreaders and journalists
British people of Indian descent